Robert, Bob or Bobby Adams may refer to:

Arts and entertainment
Bob Adams (1874–1948), one half of American vaudeville duo The Two Bobs
Robert Adams (actor) (1906–1965), British Guyanese actor
Robert Adams (sculptor) (1917–1983), British sculptor and designer
Robert Adams (science fiction writer) (1933–1990), American science fiction and fantasy writer, best known for his Horseclans series
Robert Adams (photographer) (born 1937), American photographer
Robert 'Shellsuit Bob' Adams, fictional character in BBC Scotland's River City

Sportsmen
Bob Adams (1920s pitcher) (1901–1996), American League baseball pitcher
Bob Adams (1930s pitcher) (1907–1970), National League baseball pitcher
Bob Adams (footballer) (1917–1970), English footballer who played in the Football League for Bristol Rovers, Cardiff City and Millwall
Bobby Adams (1921–1997), Major League Baseball infielder
Bob Adams (decathlete) (1924–2019), Canadian decathlete
Robert Adams (rower) (born 1942), Canadian rower
Bob Adams (American football) (born 1946), American football tight end for several National Football League teams
Robert Adams (Australian footballer) (born 1949), Australian rules footballer
Bob Adams (first baseman) (born 1952), Major League Baseball utility player

Politicians
Robert H. Adams (1792–1830), US senator from Mississippi, 1830
Robert Patten Adams (1831–1911), puisne judge and politician in Tasmania, Australia 
Robert Adams Jr. (1849–1906), member of the US House of Representatives from Pennsylvania, 1893–1906
Robert Adams, VI (1963–2019), lobbyist, political campaign manager and strategist

Others
Robert Adams (architect) (1540–1595), English architect
Robert Adams (sailor) (1790–?), American sailor and explorer
Robert Adams (physician) (1791–1875), Irish physician
Robert Adams (handgun designer) (1810–1880), British designer and manufacturer of firearms
Robert Dudley Adams (1829–1912), businessman in colonial Australia, and littérateur
Robert Adams II (1832–1882), cotton planter and officer in the army of the Confederate States of America
Sir Robert Bellew Adams (1856–1928), British general and 1897 recipient of the Victoria Cross
Robert M. Adams (literary scholar) (1915–1996), American literary scholar
Robert McCormick Adams Jr. (1926–2018), American anthropologist
Robert Adams (spiritual teacher) (1928–1997), American teacher of Advaita Vedanta (Non-dualism)
Robert Merrihew Adams (born 1937), American philosopher
Rob Adams (architect) (born 1948), director of City Design, City of Melbourne, Australia
Bob Adams (road manager) (fl. 1960s–1981), British road manager
Bob Adams (electrical engineer) (fl. 1977–2018), American engineer

See also
Rob Adams (disambiguation)
Bert Adams (disambiguation)
Robert Adam (disambiguation)
Adams (surname)